Con el dedo en el gatillo is a 1940 Argentine film directed by Luis Moglia Barth.

Cast
 Sebastián Chiola ...Salvador Di Pietro
 Alita Román ...Rosa
 Pedro Maratea ...Marú
 Nuri Montsé ...Aurora Aguirre
 Oscar Valicelli ...Américo
 José Otal ...Aquiles Bertozzi
 Cayetano Biondo ...Pólvora
 Ernesto Villegas ...Jeremías, vendedor de biblias
 Pablo Cumo ...	Policía
 Emilio Gola ...Miguel
 José Antonio Paonessa ...Comisario
 Joaquín Petrocino ...Delincuente
 Elvira Quiroga ...Madre de Salvador
 Marino Seré ...Falsificador
 Juan Vítola

References

External links
 

1940 films
1940s Spanish-language films
Argentine black-and-white films
Films directed by Luis Moglia Barth
1940s Argentine films